Universitario Fútbol Club is a Spanish football team based in Las Palmas, in the autonomous community of Canary Islands. Founded in 2018, they play in Preferente Interinsular de Las Palmas – Group 2, holding home matches at Campo de Fútbol Barrio Atlántico, with a capacity of 1,500 people.

Season to season

References

External links
 
Soccerway team profile

Football clubs in the Canary Islands
Sport in Las Palmas
Association football clubs established in 2018
2018 establishments in Spain